The 2018 Western Athletic Conference softball tournament will be held at New Mexico State Softball Complex on the campus of New Mexico State University in Las Cruces, New Mexico from May 9 through May 12, 2018.  The winner will receive the conference's automatic bid to the 2018 NCAA Division I softball tournament. All games will be streamed online on the WAC Digital Network with Adam Young and Mary Kay Mauro on the call.

Tournament

All times listed are Mountain Daylight Time.

References

Western Athletic Conference Tournament
Western Athletic Conference softball tournament
2018 in sports in New Mexico